Stuttgart Feuersee station is a railway station in the capital city of Stuttgart, located in Baden-Württemberg, Germany.

References

Feuersee
Railway stations in Germany opened in 1978
Feuersee